Brides Glen is a stop on the Luas light-rail tram system in Dún Laoghaire - Rathdown, south of Dublin, Ireland.  It opened in 2010 as the terminus of an extension of the Green Line south from Sandyford.

Location and access
Brides Glen stop is located at the end of a concrete viaduct over an empty plot of land. The sole entrance is to the road which runs past the southern end of the stop. Ramps provide access from the entrance to each of the side platforms. The short space between the platforms and the road contains buffers, a flower bed, electrical substations, and toilet for Luas drivers. There is a double crossover on the tracks immediately to the north of the stop.

Transport services

The stop provides access to the Cherrywood development, Loughlinstown, and St. Columcille's Hospital. It is also served by Dublin Bus routes 7 and 84 and by Go-Ahead Ireland route 111 to Dalkey via Dún Laoghaire.

References

Luas Green Line stops in Dún Laoghaire–Rathdown
Railway stations opened in 2010
2010 establishments in Ireland
Railway stations in the Republic of Ireland opened in the 21st century